The UK Album Chart is a weekly record chart which for most of its history was based on album sales from Sunday to Saturday in the United Kingdom. Since July 2014 it has also incorporated streaming data, and from 10 July 2015 has been based on a Friday to Thursday week. The chart was founded in 1956 and began with just a top 5 being unveiled; this was extended to a top 10 from November 1958 onwards. The first album to top the chart was Songs for Swingin' Lovers! by Frank Sinatra.

The sources, in accordance with the official canon of the Official Charts Company, are the Melody Maker chart from 1956 to 1960; the Record Retailer chart from 1960 to 1969; and the Official UK Albums Chart from 1969 onwards.

This list shows the artists who have had the most top-ten albums on the UK Albums Chart, as of 31 December 2020 (week ending). Paul McCartney holds the record for most top 10 albums with 62, having first entered the chart in Please Please Me as part of The Beatles. His most recent entry was in 2020, the solo album McCartney III. Elvis Presley is in second place with his total including 17 top ten studio albums since his final studio album, Moody Blue, was released in 1977. His UK chart rival in the late-1950s and early-1960s, Cliff Richard, comes in third. McCartney's bandmate, John Lennon, has the fourth most entries of all time in the top 10. Albums by "Various Artists" are excluded from this list because they all feature different acts under that banner.

As of March 2022, Feeder are the latest addition to the list when their 11th studio album “Torpedo” made No.5. They are the only band on the list without a week at No.1 and have the least number of weeks in the top 10 with thirteen. They were however inducted into Kerrang!’s “Hall of Fame” in August 2019.

Most top-ten albums

Notes

 Annie Lennox's total includes albums with the group Eurythmics (9).
 Cheryl's total includes albums with the group Girls Aloud (6).
 Beyoncé's total includes albums with the groups Destiny's Child (4) and The Carters (1).
 Barry Gibb's total includes albums with the group Bee Gees (16).
 Michael Jackson's total includes albums with the group The Jackson 5 (3).
 Paul McCartney's total includes albums with the groups The Beatles (33) and Wings (8)
 John Lennon's total includes albums with the group The Beatles (33) and alongside Yoko Ono (1).
 George Harrison's total includes albums with the group The Beatles (33).
 Ringo Starr's total includes albums with the group The Beatles (33).
 Jon Bon Jovi's total includes albums with the group Bon Jovi (16).
 Robbie Williams' total includes albums with the group Take That (6).
 Mick Jagger's total includes albums with the group The Rolling Stones (40).
 Keith Richards' total includes albums with the group The Rolling Stones (40).
 Agnetha Fältskog's total includes albums with the group ABBA (9).
 Freddie Mercury's total includes albums with the group Queen (27). The only Queen recording he was not part of was The Cosmos Rocks (2008) which the remaining members of the group (Brian May and Roger Taylor) collaborated on with Paul Rodgers.
 Rod Stewart's total includes albums with the group Faces (5).
 George Michael's total includes albums with the group Wham! (4).
 Liam Gallagher's total includes albums with the group Oasis (11) and Beady Eye (2).
 Noel Gallagher's total includes albums with the group Oasis (11) and Noel Gallagher's High Flying Birds (3).
 Gem Archer's total includes albums with the group Oasis (6), Beady Eye (2) and Noel Gallagher's High Flying Birds (3).
 David Gilmour's total includes albums with the group Pink Floyd (17).
 Mark Knopfler's total includes albums with the group Dire Straits (10) and a collaborative album with Emmylou Harris.
 John McVie's total includes albums with the group Fleetwood Mac (13), John Mayall & The Bluesbreakers (2) and an album with John Mayall in collaboration with Eric Clapton.
 Stevie Nicks' total includes albums with the group Fleetwood Mac (9).
 Christine McVie's total includes albums with the group Fleetwood Mac (12) and in collaboration with her bandmate Lindsey Buckingham. She performed on the album Then Play On and was not officially credited, but is included in her figure.
 Mick Hucknall's total includes albums with the group Simply Red (13).
 Paul Simon's total includes albums with the group Simon & Garfunkel (8).
 Art Garfunkel's total includes albums with the group Simon & Garfunkel (8).
 Gary Barlow's total includes albums with the group Take That (12).
 Phil Collins' total includes albums with the group Genesis (20).
 Peter Gabriel's total includes albums with the group Genesis (20).
 Debbie Harry's total includes albums with the group Blondie (9).
 Barbra Streisand's total is listed as fourteen by the Official Charts Company, but she also reached the top 10 alongside Kris Kristofferson with A Star Is Born. It shows a peak of number 86 from 1982, but the album reached number-one in 1977.
 Lionel Richie's total includes albums with the group Commodores (2).
 Brian Wilson's total includes albums with The Beach Boys (15).
 ELO's total includes two albums credited to Jeff Lynne's ELO and the soundtrack to the film Xanadu, listed as Olivia Newton-John and Electric Light Orchestra.
 Jeff Lynne's total includes albums with the group Electric Light Orchestra/Jeff Lynne's ELO (13).
 Paul Heaton's total includes albums with the group The Housemartins (3) and The Beautiful South (10).
 Dave Hemingway's total includes albums with the group The Housemartins (3) and The Beautiful South (10).
 Robert Plant's total includes albums with the group Led Zeppelin (16), in the duo Page and Plant with Jimmy Page (2), and in collaboration with Alison Krauss (1).
 Jimmy Page's total includes albums with the group Led Zeppelin (16), in the duo Page and Plant with Robert Plant (2), and with David Coverdale as Coverdale–Page (1).
 Eric Clapton's total includes albums with the group John Mayall & the Bluesbreakers (1), Cream (8) and Blind Faith (1).

References

External links
Official UK Album Top 100 at the Official Charts Company
The Official UK Top 40 Albums Chart at BBC Radio 1

British record charts
Lists of artists by record chart achievement